Belgrandiella austriana is a species of minute freshwater snail with a gill and an operculum, an aquatic gastropod mollusk in the family Hydrobiidae. This species is endemic to Austria.

References

Hydrobiidae
Belgrandiella
Endemic fauna of Austria
Gastropods described in 1975
Taxonomy articles created by Polbot